Harry Leonard Sawatzky (10 February 1931 – 30 April 2008) was a Canadian scholar in the field of human geography.

Sawatzky grew up in a traditional Plautdietsch-speaking Russian Mennonite community in southern Manitoba. He got his BA from the University of Manitoba in 1961. In 1963 he got his MA and in 1967 his PhD, both from the University of California, Berkeley. In 1963 he began his teaching at the University of Manitoba.

Works 

 They Sought a Country: Mennonite Colonization in Mexico, with an appendix on Mennonite colonization in British Honduras. Berkeley, University of California, 1971.
 Sie suchten eine Heimat : deutsch-mennonitische Kolonisierung in Mexiko, 1922 - 1984, Marburg 1986. (This book is not just a German translation of They Sought a Country, as the title seems to indicate, but a work of its own.)

References 

20th-century Canadian historians
1931 births
2008 deaths
Academic staff of the University of Manitoba
Canadian Mennonites
University of Manitoba alumni
University of California, Berkeley alumni
Canadian geographers
20th-century geographers
Mennonite writers